You're Everything may refer to:
 "You're Everything", a single by Bun B
 You're Everything, an album by Berlin Jazz Orchestra
 "You're Everything", a song by Return to Forever from the album Light as a Feather

See also 
 You Are Everything (disambiguation)
 Your Everything